CAP-GLY domain containing linker protein 1, also known as CLIP1, is a protein which in humans is encoded by the CLIP1 gene.

Interactions 

CLIP1 has been shown to interact with IQGAP1, Mammalian target of rapamycin and PAFAH1B1.

References

External links

Further reading